Midsommer (English: Midsummer) is a 2003 psychological horror film directed by Carsten Myllerup and written by Rasmus Heisterberg. The story revolves around a group of Danish students who celebrate their graduation in a Swedish forest, when they encounter a supernatural presence seemingly connected to a friend who recently committed suicide. Six months after the film's release in 2003, the film rights were purchased by Bill Block for an American remake. The American version was reset to a Louisiana bayou and released in 2007 with the title Solstice.

Plot

Cast 
 Kristian Leth  as Christian
 Laura Christensen as Trine
 Julie Ølgaard som Anja
 Nicolai Jandorf as Jannick
 Jon Lange as Mark
 Lykke Sand Michelsen as Sofie
 Tuva Novotny as Linn
 Per Oscarsson as Persson

Reception 

The film received generally positive reviews from the Danish press. The Berlingske Tidende awarded it 4 out of 6 stars, praising the films lighting, acting and effectiveness at providing surprising moments of fright, but criticized the rushed and confused quality of the film's latter half. The Politiken appreciated the filmmaker's success in elevating the film beyond the typical teen horror flick but found the abundance of mysterious happenings to be over-the-top.

Awards and nominations 
A song from the soundtrack, "Transparent and Glasslike" by Carpark North, won the award for Best Song at Denmark's 21st Robert Awards. The film also received both the Older Jury Award and Audience Award at the Leeds International Film Festival.

References

External links 
 
 
 

2003 films
2000s Danish-language films
Swedish horror films
2003 thriller drama films
Danish thriller drama films
Swedish thriller drama films
Danish horror drama films
Holiday horror films
2003 drama films
2000s Swedish films